Celtis is a genus of trees.

Celtis or similarly spelt words may refer to:

 Celtis, Missouri, a town in the United States of America
 Claas Celtis, a tractor made by CLAAS
 Conrad Celtes, a German Renaissance scholar
 Keltis, a board game